Knights of Wise Men Lodge is a historic clubhouse located on Saint Helena Island near Frogmore, Beaufort County, South Carolina. It was built about 1942, and is a simple, two-story, rectangular cinder block building with a gabled roof. It features a symmetrical, elaborate stepped façade. It was designed by the Lodge brothers and built by local masons, and is located at the rear of The Green. On holidays, the hall was used both as a dance hall and a jail.

It was listed in the National Register of Historic Places in 1996.

References

African-American history of South Carolina
Clubhouses on the National Register of Historic Places in South Carolina
Buildings and structures completed in 1942
Buildings and structures in Beaufort County, South Carolina
National Register of Historic Places in Beaufort County, South Carolina
1942 establishments in South Carolina